International No Diet Day (INDD) is an annual celebration of body acceptance, including fat acceptance and body shape diversity as well as the concept of health at any size. International No Diet Day was started by Mary Evans Young in 1992 in the United Kingdom.  Feminist groups in other countries have started to celebrate International No Diet Day, including the United States, Canada, Australia, New Zealand, India, Israel, Denmark, Sweden, and Brazil.

Since 1998, both the International Size Acceptance Association (ISAA) and the National Organization for Women (NOW) have sponsored similar days.  ISAA's day is International Size Acceptance Day which is celebrated on 24 April. NOW organized a Love Your Body campaign, with its annual Love Your Body Day in the fall, which critiques what it defines as "fake images" of the fashion, beauty, and diet industries demanding that images of women with diverse body sizes and shapes are used instead.

International No Diet Day is observed on May 6, and its symbol is a light blue ribbon.

Goals of the INDD

In celebrating International No Diet Day, participants aim to:
 Question the idea of one "right" body shape
 Raise awareness of weight discrimination, size bias, and fatphobia
 Declare a day free from diets and obsessions about body weight
 Present the facts about the diet industry, emphasizing the inefficacy of commercial diets
 Honor the victims of eating disorders and weight-loss surgery
 Help end weight discrimination, sizeism, and fatphobia

Criticism
The Institute of Medicine's Committee to Develop Criteria for Evaluating the Outcomes of Approaches to Prevent and Treat Obesity in its book Weighing the Options: Criteria for Evaluating Weight Management Programs states that "the intractability of obesity" has led to the anti-dieting movement. International No Diet Day is then mentioned and the author's comment:We agree, of course, that there should be more appreciation and acceptance of diversity in the physical attributes of people, more discouragement of dieting in vain attempts to attain unrealistic physical ideals, and no obsession with weight loss by individuals who are at or near desirable or healthy weights. However, it is inappropriate to argue that obese individuals should simply accept their body weight and not attempt to reduce, particularly if the obesity is increasing their risk for developing other medical problems or diseases.

History

International No Diet Day was created by Mary Evans Young in 1992. Young is the director of the British group "Diet Breakers". After personally experiencing anorexia nervosa, she worked to help people appreciate the body they have. Young, a British feminist, developed her understanding both through her own experiences of being bullied at school for being fat and by speaking with women who attended the management courses she ran. 

In May 1992, Young introduced the first No Diet Day. Although originally intended to be a UK-based National No Diet Day, Young was inspired to make the holiday an international one. It was a small affair to be celebrated by a dozen women with a picnic in Hyde Park, London. Ages ranged from 21 to 76 and they all wore stickers saying: "Ditch That Diet". It rained, and so Young held the picnic in her home.

By 1993, feminists in many more countries were planning on celebrating International No Diet Day. Americans, particularly those in California, Texas, New Mexico, and Arizona, were concerned that the date clashed with the Cinco de Mayo celebrations in the southern states. For Young, there was no particular significance to 5 May, so she agreed to change the date to May 6, coincidentally, her birthday.

Mainstream
INDD has evolved into No Diet Day, which is still held on May 6 and recommended as a marketing technique for restaurant owners via indulgent treats for their customers. In a similar approach, in a discussion on social marketing techniques for Australian public health educators, it was suggested that local campaigns could be tagged onto a national social marketing strategy and the example given was to attach a local Healthy Eating campaign to 'National No-Diet Day'.

See also
International Size Acceptance Association

References

External links
ABC Tasmania, Tuesday, 6 May 2003 - How to celebrate International No Diet Day
Youth Central, Government of Victoria, Australia - Eat cake on 6 May for International No Diet Day
INDD Psychology Today

Diets
Fat acceptance movement
Health awareness days
May observances
Unofficial observances